Aragaki (written: 新垣) is a Ryukyuan surname.  Another Japanese surname also spelt Aragaki in romanisation is 荒垣.

Notable people with the surname include:

, Japanese journalist
, Japanese Go player
, Japanese singer
, Japanese boxer
, Japanese actress, model and singer

Fictional characters
, a character in the light novel series Oreimo
Daisaku Aragaki,a character in yandere simulator

Japanese-language surnames